Lowman Hall is a historic academic building located on the campus of South Carolina State University at Orangeburg, Orangeburg County, South Carolina. It was built in 1917, and is a three-story, hip roofed, brick building, with projecting end pavilions. The front façade features a one-story, tetrastyle Ionic order portico.  It was originally used as a men's dormitory.

It was added to the National Register of Historic Places in 1985. It is part of the South Carolina State College Historic District.

References

African-American history of South Carolina
University and college buildings on the National Register of Historic Places in South Carolina
School buildings completed in 1917
Buildings and structures in Orangeburg County, South Carolina
National Register of Historic Places in Orangeburg County, South Carolina
Historic district contributing properties in South Carolina
1917 establishments in South Carolina